Selina Hossain (born 14 June 1947) is a Bangladeshi novelist and the current president of Bangla Academy since February 2022. Her major works include Hangor Nodi Grenade (1976) and Poka Makorer Ghor Boshoti (1996). She earned all major national awards – Bangla Academy Literary Award in 1980, Ekushey Padak in 2009 and Independence Day Award in 2018. Her novels and short stories have been translated into English, Russian, French, Japanese, Korean, Finnish and Malay. She served as the chairperson of Bangladesh Shishu Academy from 2014 until 2018.

Early life and education
Hossain was born to A. K. Mosharrof Hossain and Mariamennesa Bakul. She earned MA degree in Bengali language and literature from Rajshahi University in 1968.

Career
In 1994–95, Hossain won a scholarship from the Ford Foundation for her novel, Sandhya Gayatri.

Hossain retired as the director of the Bangla Academy. She served as a member of the National Human Rights Commission of Bangladesh and the representative of her government to the executive board of UNESCO.  In 2014, she was appointed as the Chairman of the Bangladesh Shishu Academy.

Hossain's novel Bhumi O Kusum was the first work in Bangla literature to address the enclave issue.

Works (Job)

Novels

Stories
 Utso Theke Nirontor (1969)
 Jolobotee Megher Batash (1975)
 Khol Korotal (1982)
 Porojonmo (1986)
 Manushti (1993)
 Motijaner Meyera (1995)
 Onura Purnima (2008)
 Sokhinar Chondrakola (2008)
 Ekaler Pantaburi (2008)
 Obelar Dinkhon (2009)
 Narir Rupkotha (2009)
 Nunpantar Goragori (2014)
 Mrityur Nilpadma (2015)

Awards

 Dr. Muhammad Enamul Huq Gold Medal (1969)
 Bangla Academy Literary Award (1980)
 Alaol Literary Award (1981)
 Kamar Mushtari Memorial Prize (1987)
 Philips Literary Prize (1994)
 Alakta Literary Award (1994)
 Premchand Fellowship of Sahitya Akademi
 Ekushey Padak (2009)
 Rabindra Smriti Puraskar by IIPM. New Delhi (2010)
 Chandrabati Academy Gold Medal (2010)
 International Award for Doctor of Literature (Honoris Causa) from the Rabindra Bharati University (2010)
 Surma Choudhury Memorial Award by IIPM New Delhi (2011)
 SAARC Literary Award (2015)
 Independence Day Award (2018)

References

1947 births
Living people
People from Rajshahi District
Bangladeshi women novelists
Bengali-language writers
Bangladeshi writers
Recipients of the Ekushey Padak
Recipients of Bangla Academy Award
Recipients of the Independence Day Award
20th-century novelists
21st-century novelists
20th-century Bangladeshi women writers
21st-century Bangladeshi women writers
20th-century Bangladeshi writers
21st-century Bangladeshi writers
Best Story National Film Award (Bangladesh) winners